Theodore Nettelbeck is an Australian psychologist and jazz pianist who is emeritus professor in the School of Psychology at the University of Adelaide. He is active in researching human intelligence and inspection time.

References

External links
Faculty page

Living people
Australian psychologists
Intelligence researchers
Academic staff of the University of Adelaide
Australian jazz pianists
Year of birth missing (living people)